The Swedish Work Environment Authority (SWEA) (abbreviated AV) is a Swedish administrative authority sorting under the Ministry of Employment, responsible for issues relating to the working environment and work injury statistics. The agency is tasked by the Government with issuing regulations, should spread information and furnish advice on occupational safety and health (OSH), and the relating labour laws, in particular the Work Environment Act (AML). This is primarily done with the Work Environment Authority's Statute Book (AFS), which contains provisions and general recommendations specifying the requirements to be met by the work environment. The agency also publishes other books, brochures, reports and should promote collaboration between parties on the labour market, on issues relating to OSH. Furthermore, the agency has a supervisory role for the compliance of the occupational health legislation, the Working Hours Act (SFS 1982:673) and, in certain aspects, the Tobacco Act (SFS 1993:581) and the Environmental Code (SFS 1998:808). This is usually done with inspections, and for this purpose, the agency has the right to issue stipulations and injunctions to any non-compliant employer.

See also
European Agency for Safety and Health at Work
International Labour Organization
Occupational safety and health

References

External links
Swedish Work Environment Authority - Official Site (English)

Government agencies of Sweden
Occupational safety and health organizations
Medical and health organizations based in Sweden